Encore is a studio album by American recording artist Wanda Jackson. It was released in 1988 via Amethyst Records and contained 11 tracks. The album was a collection of gospel selections and her second album with the Amethyst label. It was re-released on the Tab label in 1989 and was sold exclusively in Europe. It was the thirty fourth studio album of Jackson's career.

Background and content
Wanda Jackson became known to audiences though a series of country and Rockabilly recordings during the 1950s and 1960s. Examples included the singles "You Can't Have My Love" (1954), "Let's Have a Party" (1960), "In the Middle of a Heartache" (1961) and "Tears Will Be the Chaser for Your Wine" (1966). She left Capitol Records in the 1970s to concentrate more on gospel music. In the 1980s, Jackson was recording a mixture of gospel and country selections for various labels including Amethyst Records. Her second Amethyst project would be Encore, which was an 11-track collection of gospel songs recorded in 1988 at Studio Seven in Oklahoma City, Oklahoma. Sessions were produced by Gregg W. Gray.

Encore included covers of various gospel songs, including "I'll Fly Away" and "Just a Closer Walk with Thee". Also included is a re-recorded cover of "How Great Thou Art", which Jackson first recorded for her 1971 album Praise the Lord.  The record was originally released in 1988 on Amethyst Records as a cassette. It was Jackson's thirty fourth studio album released in her career. In 1989, it was re-released to European markets on the Tab record label. The album was distributed as a vinyl LP with an identical track listing. Tab had previously released albums by Jackson, beginning with 1984's Rockabilly Fever.

Track listings

Personnel
All credits are adapted from the liner notes of Encore.

Musical and technical personnel
 Rocky Gribble – Banjo, Guitar
 Gary Carpenter – Steel guitar
 Randy Elmore – Fiddle
 Gregg W. Gray – Keyboards, producer
 Wanda Jackson – Lead vocals
 Melodee Johnson – Background vocals
 Carolyn McCoy – Background vocals
 Dale McCoy – Background vocals
 Marty Shrabel – Bass
 Lynn Williams – Drums

Release history

References

1988 albums
Wanda Jackson albums